

Career
Jemal was born in M'saken, Tunisia.

On 11 June 2009, Jemal was linked with a move to French club FC Nantes on a four-year contract. This move would have reunited him with his former coach Gernot Rohr, but the transfer was later cancelled. On 7 May 2010, he announced his resignation from Etoile du Sahel and signed with BSC Young Boys. Jemal started the first leg of their Champions League Playoff against Tottenham Hotspur because of an injury to regular center back Emiliano Dudar.

On 30 August 2011, Jemal went on loan to 1. FC Köln for one year followed by a call back and buy option.

International goals
Scores and results list Tunisia's goal tally first.

References

External links
 
 

Living people
1987 births
Association football defenders
Tunisian footballers
Étoile Sportive du Sahel players
Club Africain players
BSC Young Boys players
1. FC Köln players
AC Ajaccio players
Al-Fateh SC players
Al-Arabi SC (Qatar) players
Al-Sahel SC (Saudi Arabia) players
Tunisian Ligue Professionnelle 1 players
Swiss Super League players
Bundesliga players
Saudi Professional League players
Qatar Stars League players
Saudi First Division League players
Tunisian expatriate footballers
Expatriate footballers in Switzerland
Expatriate footballers in Germany
Expatriate footballers in France
Expatriate footballers in Saudi Arabia
Expatriate footballers in Qatar
Tunisian expatriate sportspeople in Switzerland
Tunisian expatriate sportspeople in Germany
Tunisian expatriate sportspeople in France
Tunisian expatriate sportspeople in Saudi Arabia
Tunisian expatriate sportspeople in Qatar
Tunisia international footballers
2012 Africa Cup of Nations players